The Northern Force were the northernmost team in Netball New Zealand's former premier competition – the National Bank Cup. For the 2008 ANZ Championship the Force merged with the Auckland Diamonds to create the Northern Mystics.

Based at the North Shore Events Centre in Auckland, the Force region included North Harbour and Northland, with the majority of its players being based in Auckland. The playing colours of the team were Maroon and Black, and were sponsored by Fujifilm.

History
Perhaps the perennial under-achievers of the competition, the team had always been blessed with many talented sportswomen, yet were unable to win the competition.

Coached by former Silver Ferns coach Yvonne Willering, the Force were renowned for their formidable defensive line-ups which have included players such as Linda Vagana, Leana de Bruin and Sheryl Scanlan. The Force's midcourt was led by dynamic and inspirational captain and Silver Fern Temepara "the pocket-rocket" George. In the shooting circle, the Force boasted one of the tallest shooters in New Zealand netball at the time, Catherine Latu (at 189 cm).

Players 1998–2007
The Northern Force were filled with New Zealand talent. The defensive line was always strong and included the likes of Leana De-Bruin, Linda Vagana, Lorna Suofoa, Villimina Davu, Sheryl Scanlin, Sharlene Smith-Wolfgramm, Kate Dowling all former or current NZ players. The mid-court included world class Silver fern Temepara George, Angelina Yates and Sonya Hardcastle, all highly rated New Zealand players. Often, the shooting circle would crumble, the shooters were known for drifting in and out of the match. It included Daneka Wipiiti (Silver Fern) and Megan Dehn (former Australian Netball team) but lost them both to the Southern Sting and their new team Southern Steel. Other shooters included Catherine Latu (Samoa), Teresa Tairi (Silver Ferns), Tania Dalton (Silver Ferns) who were all former Internationals.

Shooters
In the 2006 National Bank Cup the Force were semi-finalists, being beaten by the Southern Sting 64–59 in overtime. The shooters finished the season with the following percentages:
 Catherine Latu: 83% (135 from 162)
 Megan Dehn: 82% (121 from 148)
 Brigette Tapene: 76% (70 from 92)

2007 Force Team

 Leana de Bruin – Now With Northern Stars
 Vilimaina Davu 
 Megan Dehn – Assistant Coach to NSW Swifts
 Temepara George – since retired 
 Julie Kelman-Poto
 Catherine Latu – Now With Central Pulse
 Ritua Petero
 Finau Pulu – 
 Sheryl Scanlan – Since Retired.
 Lorna Suafoa
 Bridgette Tapene
 Angelina Yates – Since Retired.

2006 Force Team
 Leana de Bruin
 Megan Dehn
 Temepara George
 Kimberley Horton- retired in 2007
 Catherine Latu
 Leigh Price
 Finau Pulu
 Lorna Suafoa – since retired
 Brigette Tapene
 Daneka Wipiiti
 Angelina Yates

2005 Force Team
 Leana de Bruin
 Kate Dowling – signed with the Canterbury Flames in 2006 and 2007
 Temepara George
 Kimberley Horton
 Catherine Latu
 Ritua Petero
 Nicolette Ropati
 Sheryl Scanlan
 Teresa Tairi
 Linda Vagana
 Daneka Wipiiti
 Angelina Yates

2004 Force Team
 Fleur Bell
 Kate Dowling
 Temepara George
 Kimberley Horton
 Julie Kelman-Poto
 Sheryl Scanlan
 Matelita Shaw
 Teresa Tairi
 Linda Vagana
 Daneka Wipiiti
 Angelina Yates

2003 Force Team
 Kate Dowling
 Temepara George
 Malu Fa'asavalu
 Kimberley Horton
 Nicolette Ropati
 Sheryl Scanlan
 Laila Sturgeon
 Lorna Suafoa
 Teresa Tairi
 Linda Vagana
 Daneka Wipiiti
 Angelina Yates

2002 Force Team
 Kate Dowling
 Temepara George
 Malu Fa'asavalu 
 Rochelle Hardcastle
 Leonie Matoe
 Sheryl Scanlan
 Lorna Suafoa
 Laila Sturgeon
 Jenna Swann
 Teresa Tairi
 Linda Vagana
 Daneka Wipiiti

2001 Force Team
 Tania Dalton 
 Kate Dowling
 Temepara George
 Rochelle Hardcastle
 Sonya Hardcastle
 Kathleen Lye
 Nicolette Ropati
 Sheryl Scanlan
 Sharlene Smith signed for comtez 
 Anna Tai
 Teresa Tairi
 Corlie Wolmarans
 Linda Vagana
 Owena Zanders

2000 Force Team
 Vanessa Banbrook
 Elizabeth Dean 
 Tania Dalton 
 Kate Dowling
 Temepara George
 Kathleen Lye
 Elise Middleton
 Sheryl Scanlan
 Sharlene Smith
 Anna Tai 
 Teresa Tairi
 Linda Vagana

1999 Force Team
 Jenny May Coffin
 Elizabeth Dean 
 Sonya Hardcastle 
 Opheira Harder 
 Dionne Moors
 Sharon Pomfrett
 Sheryl Scanlan
 Sharlene Smith
 Laila Sturgeon 
 Lorna Suafoa
 Teresa Tairi
 Linda Vagana

1998 Force Team
 Teresa Dobbs 
 Sonya Hardcastle 
 Lise Inu
 Kate Newson
 Tania Dalton
 Pauline Marsh
 Janine Topia
 Sheryl Scanlan
 Sharlene Smith
 Lorna Suafoa
 Teresa Tairi
 Linda Vagana

Coaches
Renowned coach Yvonne Willering served the longest coaching term from 2003 to 2007. Australian Maria Lynch served from 2000 to 2002. Alison Wieringa in 1999 and ex-National league player Mary Jane Araroa coached the team in its first round of the competition in 1998.

Record for the Force in the National Bank Cup
 2007– 2nd 
 2006– 3rd
 2005– 3rd
 2004– 4th
 2003– 2nd
 2002– 3rd
 2001– 5th
 2000– 4th
 1999– 3rd
 1998– 5th

Overall winning percentage of 61%, which is the second highest winning percentage for any team in the history of the competition.

2007
For the 2007 competition, the Force named a formidable squad, with the inclusion of former Silver Ferns defender Vilimaina Davu transferring from the Canterbury Flames and Sheryl Scanlan returning from pregnancy. This left the Force with an intimidating four Silver Ferns (three former, one current) in their defence end. Suafoa, Scanlan and Davu were former Silver Ferns while de Bruin was a current member of the New Zealand team.

References
https://web.archive.org/web/20071013190923/http://netballnz.co.nz/default.aspx?s=nbank_team_force
 'Northern Force 1998 – 2007'

Defunct netball teams in New Zealand
National Bank Cup teams
Sports clubs established in 1998
1998 establishments in New Zealand
Sports clubs disestablished in 2007
2007 disestablishments in New Zealand
Northern Mystics
Netball teams in Auckland